Sulfhemoglobinemia  is a rare condition in which there is excess sulfhemoglobin (SulfHb) in the blood. The pigment is a greenish derivative of hemoglobin which cannot be converted back to normal, functional hemoglobin. It causes cyanosis even at low blood levels.

It is a rare blood condition in which the β-pyrrole ring of the hemoglobin molecule has the ability to bind irreversibly to any substance containing a sulfur atom. When hydrogen sulfide (H2S) (or sulfide ions) and ferrous ions combine in the heme of hemoglobin, the blood is thus incapable of transporting oxygen to the tissues.

Presentation
Symptoms include a blueish or greenish coloration of the blood (cyanosis), skin, and mucous membranes, even though a blood count test may not show any abnormalities in the blood.
This discoloration is caused by greater than 5 grams per cent of deoxyhemoglobin, or 1.5 grams per cent of methemoglobin, or 0.5 grams per cent of sulfhemoglobin, all serious medical abnormalities.

Causes
Sulfhemoglobinemia is usually drug induced, with drugs associated with it including sulphonamides, such as sulfasalazine or sumatriptan. Another possible cause is occupational exposure to sulfur compounds.

It can also be caused by phenazopyridine.

Treatment
The condition generally resolves itself with erythrocyte (red blood cell) turnover, although blood transfusions can be necessary in extreme cases.

Notable cases
On June 8, 2007, Canadian anesthesiologists Dr. Stephan Schwarz, Dr. Giuseppe Del Vicario, and Dr. Alana Flexman presented an unusual case in The Lancet.  A 42-year-old male patient was brought into Vancouver's St. Paul's Hospital after falling asleep in a kneeling position, which caused compartment syndrome and a buildup of pressure in his legs. When doctors drew the man's blood prior to performing the surgery to relieve the pressure from the man's legs, they noted his blood was green. A sample of the blood was immediately sent to a lab. In this case, sulfhemoglobinemia was possibly caused by the patient taking higher-than-prescribed doses of sumatriptan.

References

External links 
 Cancer Web Project Online Medical Dictionary

Red blood cell disorders
Hemoglobins